Beris fuscipes, the short-horned black legionnaire, is a European species of soldier fly.

Description
Head dark. Antennae short the antennal flagellum thickened basally, as wide as pedicel and narrowed sharply toward apex, almost trapezoidal. Thorax and scutellum bright shining green, not in the least blackish, Abdomen black, legs extensively dark dull orange or dusky. Scutellum with usually six (sometimes eight) spines. Epandrium with developed surstyli.  Very similar to Beris geniculata.

Biology
Beris fuscipes occurs in damp woodland, marshes and fens from May-September.

Distribution
Most of Europe including European Russia. North America.

References

Stratiomyidae
Diptera of Europe
Diptera of North America
Insects described in 1820
Taxa named by Johann Wilhelm Meigen